The Journal of Medical Economics is a monthly peer-reviewed academic journal that covers econometric assessments of novel therapeutic and medical device interventions. It is published by Routledge and was established in 1998. The editor-in-chief is K. Lee.

Abstracting and indexing
The journal is abstracted and indexed in:
CAB Abstracts
Embase
Index Medicus/MEDLINE/PubMed
Science Citation Index Expanded
Scopus

References

External links

Economics journals
General medical journals
Publications established in 1998
Monthly journals
Taylor & Francis academic journals
English-language journals